Arena Parco Nord is a natural amphitheatre located in Bologna, Italy. It is used primarily for open-air concerts. The amphitheatre has served as the venue for the Independent Days Festival since 1999. It also hosted part of the European Monsters of Rock tour in 1990.

References

Amphitheatres in Italy
Music venues in Italy